The 2017–18 Campionato Sammarinese di Calcio was the 33rd season since its establishment. It is the highest level in San Marino, in which the country's top 15 amateur football clubs played. The season begin on 8 September 2017 and concluded with the play-off final on 23 May 2018. La Fiorita were the defending champions from the previous season. The fixtures and group compositions were announced on 19 August 2017.

Participating teams

Because there is no promotion or relegation in the league, the same 15 teams who competed in the league last season competed in the league this season.
 S.P. Cailungo (Borgo Maggiore)
 S.S. Cosmos (Serravalle)
 F.C. Domagnano (Domagnano)
 S.C. Faetano (Faetano)
 F.C. Fiorentino (Fiorentino)
 S.S. Folgore Falciano Calcio (Serravalle)
 A.C. Juvenes/Dogana (Serravalle)
 S.P. La Fiorita (Montegiardino)
 A.C. Libertas (Borgo Maggiore)
 S.S. Murata (San Marino)
 S.S. Pennarossa (Chiesanuova)
 S.S. San Giovanni (Borgo Maggiore)
 S.P. Tre Fiori (Fiorentino)
 S.P. Tre Penne (Serravalle)
 S.S. Virtus (Acquaviva)

Regular season
The 15 clubs were split into two groups; one with eight clubs and another with seven clubs.

Group A

Group B

Results
All teams played twice against the teams within their own group and once against the teams from the other group. This means that the clubs in the eight-club group played 21 matches each while the clubs in the seven-club group played 20 matches each during the regular season.

Play-offs
The top three teams from each group advanced to a play-off which determined the season's champion and qualifiers for the Champions League and the Europa League.

The play-offs were played in a double-elimination format with both regular season group winners earning byes in the first and second round. All matches were decided over one leg with extra time and then penalties used to break ties, when required.

Bracket

First round

Second round

Domagnano eliminated.

Third round

Libertas eliminated.

Fourth round

Tre Penne eliminated.

Semi-final

 Tre Fiori eliminated and qualified for Europa League.

Final

La Fiorita qualified for 2018–19 Champions League preliminary round and Folgore qualified for 2018–19 Europa League preliminary  round.

References

External links
 

Campionato Sammarinese di Calcio
San Marino
1